Ernest Smith (13 January 1912 – 14 October 1996) was an English professional footballer who played as an inside forward.

References

1912 births
1996 deaths
People from Shirebrook
Footballers from Derbyshire
English footballers
Association football inside forwards
Burnley F.C. players
Nottingham Forest F.C. players
Rotherham United F.C. players
Plymouth Argyle F.C. players
English Football League players